The Ken Dryden Award is an annual award given out at the conclusion of the ECAC Hockey regular season to the best goaltender in the conference as voted by the coaches of each ECAC team.

The Ken Dryden Award was first awarded in 1996 and every year thereafter. It is named in honor of famed Cornell goaltender Ken Dryden who led the Big Red to their first National Title in 1967.

Award winners

Winners by school

See also
ECAC Hockey Awards

References

General

Specific

External links
ECAC Hockey Awards (Incomplete)

College ice hockey goaltender awards in the United States
College ice hockey trophies and awards in the United States
ECAC Hockey